Tracy Austin defeated Martina Navratilova in the final, 1–6, 7–6(7–4), 7–6(7–1) to win the women's singles tennis title at the 1981 US Open. It was her second US Open title.

Chris Evert was the defending champion, but lost in the semifinals to Navratilova. The loss ended Evert's streak of six consecutive US Open finals.

Seeds
The seeded players are listed below. Tracy Austin is the champion; others show the round in which they were eliminated.

  Chris Evert (semifinalist)
  Andrea Jaeger (second round)
  Tracy Austin (champion)
  Martina Navratilova (finalist)
  Hana Mandlíková (quarterfinalist)
  Sylvia Hanika (quarterfinalist)
  Wendy Turnbull (third round)
  Pam Shriver (fourth round)
  Virginia Ruzici (third round)
  Mima Jaušovec (second round)
  Barbara Potter (semifinalist)
  Bettina Bunge (fourth round)
  Regina Maršíková (first round)
  Kathy Jordan (fourth round)
  Sue Barker (second round)
  Dianne Fromholtz (first round)

Qualifying

Draw

Key
 Q = Qualifier
 WC = Wild card
 LL = Lucky loser
 r = Retired

Final eight

Earlier rounds

Section 1

Section 2

Section 3

Section 4

Section 5

Section 6

Section 7

Section 8

See also
 Evert–Navratilova rivalry

External links
1981 US Open – Women's draws and results at the International Tennis Federation

Women's Singles
US Open (tennis) by year – Women's singles
1981 in women's tennis
1981 in American women's sports